"The Significance of the Frontier in American History" is a seminal essay by the American historian Frederick Jackson Turner which advanced the  Frontier thesis of American history. It was presented to a special meeting of the American Historical Association at the World's Columbian Exposition in Chicago, Illinois in 1893, and published later that year first in Proceedings of the State Historical Society of Wisconsin, then in the Annual Report of the American Historical Association. It has been subsequently reprinted and anthologized many times, and was incorporated into Turner's 1920 book, The Frontier in American History, as Chapter I.

The essay summarizes Turner's views on how the idea of the American frontier shaped the American character in terms of democracy and violence. He stresses how the availability of very large amounts of nearly free farm land built agriculture, pulled ambitious families to the western frontier, and created an ethos of unlimited opportunity. The frontier helped shape individualism and opposition to governmental control.

Turner speculated how the frontier drove American history and helped shape American culture in the 1890s. Turner reflects on the past to illustrate his point by noting human fascination with the frontier and how expansion to the American West changed American views on its culture. The essay had a major impact on historiography for decades, with serious criticism emerging in the 1940s. In the 1980s a new approach to the Western U.S. appeared which was much more negative.

Australian historian Brett Bowden has explored how the concept of "frontier" has been very widely used in both the scholarly and the popular literature to denote challenging new forces.  By contrast, medievalist Nora Berend asked: "What good is a concept not very clearly formulated a hundred years ago—Turner’s frontier was an elastic term that had no sharp definition—and severely criticised ever since?"

Opposition to the Turner Thesis

In 1942, in "The Frontier and American Institutions: A Criticism of the Turner Thesis," Professor George Wilson Pierson debated the validity of the Turner thesis, stating that many factors influenced American culture besides the looming frontier. Although he respected Turner, Pierson strongly argues his point by looking beyond the frontier and acknowledging other factors in American development.

The Turner Thesis was also critiqued by Patricia Nelson Limerick in her 1987 book, The Legacy of Conquest: The Unbroken Past of the American West.  Limerick asserts the notion of a "New Western History" in which the American West is treated as a place and not a process of finite expansion.  Limerick pushes for a continuation of study within the historical and social atmosphere of the American West, which she believes did not end in 1890, but rather continues on to this very day.

Urban historian Richard C. Wade challenged the Frontier Thesis in his first asset, The Urban Frontier (1959), asserting that western cities such as Pittsburgh, Louisville, and Cincinnati, not the farmer pioneers, were the catalysts for western expansion.

Glenda Riley has argued that Turner's thesis ignored women. She argues that his context and upbringing led him to ignore the female portion of society, which directly led to the frontier becoming an exclusively male phenomenon. The exclusion of women is one of the central debates around his work, particularly referred to by New Western Historians.

References

Further reading
 Bowden, Brett. "Frontiers—Old, New, and Final." European Legacy 25.6 (2020): 671–686.
 Bazzi, Samuel, Martin Fiszbein, and Mesay Gebresilasse. "Frontier culture: The roots and persistence of “rugged individualism” in the United States." Econometrica 88.6 (2020): 2329-2368. Statistical support for Turner's thesis. online
 Carpenter, Ronald H. "Frederick Jackson Turner and the rhetorical impact of the frontier thesis." Quarterly Journal of Speech 63.2 (1977): 117–129.
 Cronon, William. "Revisiting the vanishing frontier: The legacy of Frederick Jackson Turner." Western Historical Quarterly 18.2 (1987): 157-176 online
 Faragher, John Mack. "The frontier trail: rethinking Turner and reimagining the American West." (1993) American Historical Review 98#1 (1993), pp. 106–117. online
 Ford, Lacy K. "Frontier democracy: The Turner thesis revisited." Journal of the Early Republic 13.2 (1993): 144–163. online
 Hofstadter, Richard. "Turner and the frontier myth." The American Scholar (1949): 433–443. online; hostile.
 Limerick, Patricia Nelson. "Turnerians all: the dream of a helpful history in an intelligible world." American Historical Review 100.3 (1995): 697–716. online

Primary sources
 Faragher, John Mack ed. Rereading Frederick Jackson Turner: "The significance of the frontier in American history", and other essays (Yale University Press, 1999); reprints Turner's essays.

External links

 The Frontier in American History at Project Gutenberg
 
 E-book version of The Frontier in American History
Extra Census Bulletin No. 2 (1891) Distribution of Population According to Density: 1890

History books about the American Old West
1893 essays